Kongkiat "Kome" Komesiri (born 2 June 1975, in Thailand) is a Thai film director and screenwriter.

Film career
He graduated from the Faculty of Mass Communications at Bangkok University and started his career as a crew member on Mysterious Object at Noon, the first feature film by Apichatpong Weerasethakul. He then went to work for Five Star Production, working with director Thanit Jitnukul on the films Bang Rajan and Kunpan: Legend of the Warlord.

He made his directorial debut in 2005 with Art of the Devil 2, credited as part of the seven-member "Ronin Team" of directors. His solo directorial debut was Muay Thai Chaiya in 2007. Khomsiri's project called Slice. In 2022, he directed KinnPorsche, The Series.

Filmography

Films
as director
 Art of the Devil 2 (2005)
 Muay Thai Chaiya (2007)
 Art of the Devil 3 (2008)
 Slice (2010)
 The Gangster (2012)
Take Me Home (2016)
Khun Pan (2016)
Khun Pan 2 (2018)
Khun Phaen Begins (2019)
Khun Pan 3 (2023)

as screenwriter
 Bang Rajan (2000)
 Kunpan: Legend of the Warlord (2000)
 Art of the Devil 2 (2005)
 The Unseeable (2006)
 Art of the Devil 3 (2008)
 Slice (2010)
 Dark Flight (2012)
 The Gangster (2012)
Take Me Home (2016)
Khun Pan (2016)
Khun Pan 2 (2018)
Khun Pan 3 (2023)

TV series
as director
 KinnPorsche (2022)
 The Brothers (2015)
as screenwriter
 The Brothers (2015)

References

External links

1975 births
Kongkiat Khomsiri
Kongkiat Khomsiri
Living people
Kongkiat Khomsiri
Kongkiat Khomsiri
Horror film directors